Leon Rene Yankwich (September 25, 1888 – February 9, 1975) was a United States district judge of the United States District Court for the Southern District of California.

Education and career

Born in Iași, Romania, Yankwich received a Bachelor of Laws from Willamette University College of Law in 1909. He was in private practice in Modesto, California from 1909 to 1916, and in Los Angeles, California from 1916 to 1927, interrupted by service as a Sergeant in the United States Army during World War I in 1918. He received a Juris Doctor from Loyola Law School in Los Angeles in 1926. He was a Judge of the Superior Court of Los Angeles County from 1927 to 1935.

Federal judicial service

Yankwich was nominated by President Franklin D. Roosevelt on August 21, 1935, to the United States District Court for the Southern District of California, to a new seat authorized by 49 Stat. 508. He was confirmed by the United States Senate on August 23, 1935, and received his commission on August 24, 1935. He served as Chief Judge from 1951 to 1959. He assumed senior status on April 28, 1964. Yankwich was reassigned by operation of law to the United States District Court for the Central District of California on September 18, 1966, pursuant to 80 Stat. 75. His service terminated on February 9, 1975, due to his death.

Notable cases

Yankwich tried Cain v. Universal Pictures (1942), a case in which the writer James M. Cain sued Universal Pictures, the scriptwriter and the director for copyright infringement in connection with the film When Tomorrow Comes.  Cain claimed a scene in his book where two protagonists take refuge from a storm in a church had been copied in a scene depicting the same situation in the movie. Yankwich ruled that there was no resemblance between the scenes in the book and the film other than incidental scènes à faire, or natural similarities due to the situation, establishing an important legal precedent.

Yankwich decided several important cases involving racial minorities.  He invalidated segregation in Lopez v. Seccombe (1944), a decision prohibiting discrimination against persons of Mexican ancestry in San Bernardino's public recreational facilities.  In Uyeno v. Acheson (1951), he held that a birthright citizen had not been  expatriated by voting in an election in Occupied Japan in 1947: "In the present case, the testimony of the plaintiff is that the constant reiteration through newspapers and over the radio, and by friends and advisers of the importance of voting and the need for voting was taken by him as 'a command' on the part of General MacArthur and the Occupation Forces to vote, which he could not, with impunity, disobey. Indeed, he testified that, in addition to this, he was led to believe that if he did not vote, he would lose his food ration card."

References

Sources
 

1888 births
1975 deaths
California state court judges
Judges of the United States District Court for the Southern District of California
Judges of the United States District Court for the Central District of California
United States district court judges appointed by Franklin D. Roosevelt
20th-century American judges
Willamette University College of Law alumni
Romanian emigrants to the United States
United States Army soldiers